Caussin may refer to:

 Armand-Pierre Caussin de Perceval (1795–1871), French orientalist
 Jean-Jacques-Antoine Caussin de Perceval, (1759–1835), French orientalist, father of the previous one
 Mike Caussin (born 1987), American football player
 Nicolas Caussin, French Jesuit (1583–1651)